The Togo Davis Cup team represents Togo in Davis Cup tennis competition and are governed by the Togo Tennis Federation.

They reached the Group II semifinals in 1992.

History
Togo competed in its first Davis Cup in 1990.

Togo last played in Davis Cup in 2003.

Current team (2022) 

 Thomas Setodji
 Liova Ayite Ajavon
 Komlavi Loglo (Captain-player)
 M'lapa Tingou Akomlo
 Hod'abalo isak Padio (Junior player)

See also
Davis Cup

External links

Davis Cup teams
Davis Cup
Davis Cup